Collection occurs when a horse's center of gravity is shifted backwards. Energy is directed in a more horizontal trajectory with less forward movement (limbs generate higher vertical impulses). Biomechanical markers include: increased flexion in the lumbo-sacral joint, stifle, and hocks of the horse; increased engagement of the thoracic sling muscles resulting in the withers rising relative to the horse's scapula; and reduced ranges of limb protraction–retraction.

Collection in riding

Collection is also an important ingredient in riding, if the rider wishes to perform more advanced movements or jumping. It not only allows the horse to move more easily and athletically, but also helps prevent wear-and-tear on the front legs. Through training, the horse learns to collect itself when requested to do so by the rider. The observer receives the impression of great strength held under perfect control.

The most readily apparent form of collection can be observed when comparing different degrees of collection within a single gait. A more collected gait will have two main symptoms: the horse will lower his hindquarters and raise his forehand, and the horse will have more bend in the joints of his legs. Additionally, the stride length will be shortened. Collection may be performed at any gait.

However, this does not mean that any shortened gait is collected. Riders who try to pull their horses into a shortened gait (riding "front-to-back"), rather than contain the energy coming from the hindquarters (riding "back-to-front"), will produce a shortened stride, but the horse will continue to carry his weight on his front end, and will simply have stiff, unathletic movement. The shoulders will not be raised, and the horse will find it more difficult to perform a task than he would otherwise. The hind legs will usually be "strung out behind," rather than coming up under the body with each stride to support it, and the back will be dropped rather than properly raised upward.

Specific uses in sport
Collected gaits are asked for in dressage tests from the mid-levels upward, at the walk, trot, and canter. Additionally, a high degree of collection is required of the rider in more advanced dressage moves, such as the pirouette, piaffe, and passage. The ultimate level of collection is the levade, in which the horse carries 100% of his weight on his hindquarters. Unlike a rearing horse, the horse's rear legs are well under it, and it can safely support itself in an upright position for a time and then lower itself to the ground under control.  

Collection is also essential in jumping. Most horses will physically be unable to jump extremely high fences (such as those seen in Grand Prix show jumping or puissance classes) without collection, as they will not have enough power to make it over the obstacle. Speed is not a substitute, and a horse that is simply galloped at a fence will find it extremely difficult to raise his forehand upward on takeoff and gain enough height over the fence. Instead, he will jump flat, without bascule, and will be much more likely to pull a rail. Secondly, horses must be adjustable within jumping courses, having the ability to shorten or lengthen their stride between obstacles, especially if placed in a combination. A horse that is not collected will find it very hard to seamlessly shorten his stride in a related distance, and may be forced to take off too close or too far away from the jump, which greatly increases the chance he will hit it.

Collection also makes it easier for a horse to make sudden changes of direction, such as those required by western performance horses. Cutting horses are excellent examples, as they crouch low and back on their hindquarters so they may quickly move side to side to mirror the movements of the calf.

Riding techniques and movements
Dressage terminology